Borna is a masculine Croatian given name. It is also a masculine Persian given name,. Borna in Persian language means young. Notable people with the name include:

Borna (duke) (died 821), Duke of Dalmatia
Borna Barišić (born 1992), Croatian football player
Borna Ćorić (born 1996), Croatian tennis player
Borna Franić (born 1975), Croatian handball player
Borna Gojo (born 1998), Croatian tennis player
Borna Rendulić (born 1992), Croatian ice hockey player
Borna Sosa (born 1998), Croatian football player

Croatian masculine given names